The Barbados Bar Association is a voluntary association of attorneys in Barbados who practise at the independent bar as barristers and Queen's Counsel. It was created by the Barbados Bar Association Act of 1940.

See also 
 Commonwealth Lawyers Association (CLA)

References

External links

Bar associations
Bar Association, Barbados
Organizations established in 1940
Law of Barbados
1940 establishments in Barbados
Barbados in World War II